Prof. Suraj Paliwal (born 8 November 1951) is an Indian professor and author who writes in Hindi.

Award 
 Premchand Award, Panjub Academy Award for Art and Literature
 Dr. Ram Vilash Sharma Award for Criticism 
 Acharya Niranjan Nath Literary Award

Works in Hindi

Criticism
 Phanishwarnath Renu Ka Katha Sahitya

Works in Hindi
 "Tika Pradhan"
 "Jangal"

References

Writers from Uttar Pradesh
Hindi-language writers
Indian critics
People from Mathura
1951 births
Living people